The Mortara Center for International Studies is an academic research center at Georgetown University in Washington, D.C. As part of Georgetown's Edmund A. Walsh School of Foreign Service, the Mortara Center organizes and co-sponsors lectures, seminars, and conferences and provides support for research and publications on international affairs. The current Director of the Mortara Center is  Professor and Chair of the Georgetown University International Theory and Research Seminar (GUITARS) Abraham L. Newman. Past Directors include Kathleen R. McNamara, John McNeill, Carol Lancaster, Charles Kupchan, and John Ikenberry. Former United States Secretary of State Madeleine Albright is the Michael and Virginia Mortara Distinguished Professor in the Practice of Diplomacy. The Mortara Center was established through a gift from the Michael and Virginia Mortara Foundation.

Mission

The stated mission of the Mortara Center:

The Mortara Center for International Studies seeks to advance scholarship and inform policy by combining the expertise of scholars and the experience of international affairs practitioners to illuminate the fundamental forces — political, economic, and cultural — that shape international relations. To realize this mission, the Center organizes and co-sponsors lectures, seminars, and conferences and provides support for research and publications.

History

Founding
The Mortara Center for International Studies was established in 2003 with a gift from the Michael and Virginia Mortara Foundation. At the time of his death in November 2000, Mr. Mortara was president and chief executive officer of Goldman Sachs Ventures. As an alumnus, Mortara served on the University's Board of Directors, recruited Georgetown students to Goldman Sachs, and encouraged the firm to support a variety of projects on campus. Virginia Mortara also has served as a past member of the Georgetown Board of Directors and Board of Regents. She currently sits on the School of Foreign Service Visiting Board. The Mortaras' elder son is a graduate of the School of Foreign Service class of 2004, and their younger son is a graduate of the class of 2009.

Mortara Building

The Mortara Center is located at 3600 N Street NW. Opened in September 2005, the building features a conference room with audio-visual technology (including VTC) utilized for classes and events, office facilities for School of Foreign Service faculty, and Georgetown's Center for Security Studies.

Lepgold Book Prize

The Mortara Center oversees the annual Georgetown University Lepgold Book Prize. The prize was created in honor of Joseph S. Lepgold, a Georgetown University Government and School of Foreign Service professor who died in December 2001. The $1,000 prize honors exceptional contributions to the study of international relations, with specific emphasis on the resolution of critical policy challenges. The winning author gives a lecture at the Mortara Center on his or her scholarship.

Past Winners
2019: Constructing Allied Cooperation: Diplomacy, Payments, and Power in Multilateral Military Coalitions, by Marina E Henke and Arguing about Alliances: The Art of Agreement in Military-Pact Negotiations, by Paul Poast
2018: Secret Wars: Covert Conflict In International Politics, by Austin Carson
2017: Fighting for Status: Hierarchy and Conflict in World Politics, by Jonathan Renshon
2016: Violence and Restraint in Civil War: Civilian Targeting in the Shadow of International Law, by Jessica A. Stanton
2015: Making and Unmaking Nations: War, Leadership and Genocide in Modern Africa, by Scott Straus
2014: Networks of Rebellion: Explaining Insurgent Cohesion and Collapse, by Paul Staniland 
2013: The Company States Keep, by Julia Gray
2012: Alliance Formation in Civil Wars, by Fotini Christia
2011: Leaders and International Conflict, by Giacomo Chiozza and H. E. Goemans
2010: The Clash of Ideas in World Politics, by John Owen
2009: The Invisible Hand of Peace, by Patrick J. McDonald
2008: Targeting Civilians in War, by Alexander Downes
2007: The Nuclear Taboo, by Nina Tannenwald
2006: Dangerous Nation, by Robert Kagan
2005: The Remnants of War, by John Mueller
2004: Electing to Fight, by Edward D. Mansfield and Jack Snyder
2003: Power and Purpose: U.S. Policy Toward Russia After the Cold War, by James Goldgeier and Michael McFaul
2002: A Problem from Hell: America and the Age of Genocide, by Samantha Power
2001: The Tragedy of Great Power Politics, by John J. Mearsheimer

Events

Goldman Sachs Distinguished Lecture Series

The Goldman Sachs Distinguished Lecture features an internationally recognized scholar or government official speaking on an international issue of public concern. Past speakers have included Lawrence Summers, Samuel P. Huntington, John Ruggie, Robert Rubin, Ellen Johnson-Sirleaf, and Russell Feingold.

Modern International History Lectures 

The Modern International History Lecture features a contemporary historian who presents on an aspect of recent history related to international relations. The inaugural lecture was given by Yale University's John Lewis Gaddis in 2006. Past lecturers include Paul Kennedy, Niall Ferguson, and Margaret MacMillan.

Illuminati Dinner Series 

The Illuminati Dinner Series at the Mortara Center is a formal dinner series where students converse with Georgetown's distinguished visiting scholars and faculty practitioners.

Research

Mortara Undergraduate Research Fellows

The Mortara Undergraduate Research Fellows (MURFS) Program partners a select group of School of Foreign Service students with professors to collaborate on research projects on contemporary international relations issues throughout their undergraduate career.

Research Seminars

Mortara's research seminars unite faculty and students to discuss new research in academic disciplines of the School of Foreign Service. Research seminar sessions bring together Georgetown faculty, students, and invited scholars from various disciplines to share ideas, critique working papers, and collaborate on research. These meetings are made possible through partnerships with the Departments of History, Government and the Georgetown Public Policy Institute. The current research seminar groups include:

International Political Economy Working Group
Georgetown University International Theory and Research Seminar (GUITARS)
Current Research on Issues and Topics in Comparative Scholarship (CRITICS)
Energy and Climate 
International History Seminar

Global Political Economy Project 
Funded by a grant from the Open Society Foundation, the Global Political Economy Project aims to spur research on how the globalization of markets affects all aspects of people's lives and how the power of globalization can be used as a force for good in the world.

References

External links 
Official website
Article in Georgetown Magazine
Michael Mortara obituary

Georgetown University programs
Georgetown University buildings
Academic organizations based in the United States